Idz is a three-letter initialism or abbreviation which may refer to:

Music 
 "Ijime, Dame, Zettai", a single by Babymetal, or three editions ("I", "D", "Z") of said single.
 Live: Legend I, D, Z Apocalypse, a live video album by Babymetal

Other uses 
 Infanterist der Zukunft, a German fighting system